Local elections in the Philippines were held on May 13, 2019. This was conducted together with the 2019 general election for national positions. All elected positions above the barangay (village) level were disputed. The following positions were disputed:

 81 provincial governorships and vice-governorships
 780 Provincial Board (Sangguniang Panlalawigan) members
 1,634 mayorships and vice mayorships
 13,544 city and municipal councilors (Sangguniang Panlungsod and Sangguniang Bayan)

The elective positions in the Bangsamoro Autonomous Region in Muslim Mindanao (BARMM) were not decided on this day. The first elections for BARMM will be done after the 2020 Philippine census is published.

The elective positions in the barangays were also not decided on this day. These were supposed to be held in October 2016, but were postponed to October 2017, then again to May 2018.

Electoral system 
Every local government unit, be it a province, city, municipality or a barangay elects a chief executive (a governor, city mayor, municipal mayor and barangay chairman, respectively), and a local legislature (the Sangguniang Panlalawigan, Sangguniang Panlungsod, Sangguniang Bayan and Sangguniang Barangay, respectively), president upon by the chief executive's deputy (vice-governor, city vice-mayor, and municipal vice-mayor, respectively; no equivalent for the barangay where the barangay chairman presides the Sangguniang Barangay).

Chief executive 
Provincial governors and vice governors in each of the 81 provinces, and mayor and vice mayor in each of the 145 cities and 1,489 municipalities are elected via the first-past-the-post system.

Legislatures 
For the membership in local legislatures the elections are done via plurality-at-large voting. For Sangguniang Panlalawigan seats, the Commission on Elections divides all provinces into at least 2 districts, if it is not divided into such, while for Sangguniang Panlungsod seats, the appropriation depends on the city charter (some are divided into districts, while others elect all councilors at-large), and for Sangguniang Bayan seats, all municipalities have eight councilors elected at-large, except for Pateros, which elects twelve, six in each district.

Winners in this election will have their terms start on June 30, 2019, and end on June 30, 2022.

Ex officio and reserved seats 
The city or municipal presidents of the Liga ng mga Barangay (ABC, for its old name Association of Barangay Captains) and Sangguniang Kabataan (SK; youth councils) sit as ex officio members of the Sangguniang Bayan or Sangguniang Panlungsod of which its barangay is a part of.

For the Sangguniang Panlalawigan, the provincial presidents of the ABC and SK, along with the provincial presidents of the Philippine Councilors League (PCL) sit as its ex officio members.

Some legislatures have a reserved seat for indigenous people, called the "indigenous people mandatory representation (IPMR)". These are not indicated in the national totals.

When the legislatures elected in 2019 first convened, the ABC and SK presidents elected in 2018 were still serving, and will serve until January 1, 2023. Barangay elections are nonpartisan.

People selected as IPMR serve for three years. These selections are done by the indigenous people themselves under the supervision of the National Commission on Indigenous People. The terms are not usually aligned with local or barangay elections.

Ex officio members and IPMR are accorded full voting rights and privileges accorded to regularly elected members of each legislature.

Participating parties

National parties

Local parties
In the presentation below, the order for legislatures is determined by the following:

 Ex officio seats, arranged by:
 Liga ng mga Barangay member (nonpartisan)
 Philippine Councilors League member (with corresponding color of his/her political party), for Sangguniang Panlalawigan elections.
 Sangguniang Kabataan member (nonpartisan)
 Reserved seats
 This can be either be none, for most provinces, one, for some provinces, or three, for Isabela and Tawi-Tawi.
 Election results
 Parties by number of seats
 If tied, by alphanumeric order
 Independents

Provincial elections 

Local parties are denoted by purple (unless otherwise indicated), independents by light gray, and ex officio members of the legislatures are in dark gray.

 Summary of results, parties ranked by governorships won.
Ex officio members are the representatives of the provincial chapters of the Liga ng mga Barangay, Sangguniang Kabataan (SK), and Philippine Councilors League (PCL). 
The first two ex officio members are determined from the nonpartisan 2018 barangay and SK elections. They first served on July 30, 2018, and will serve until January 1, 2022.
The PCL member is determined after the 2019 municipal elections. The elections within each provincial chapter were held in late 2019.
 Some boards have a reserved seat for indigenous people, called the "indigenous people mandatory representation (IPMR)".  These are not indicated in the national totals.
 Tawi-Tawi Provincial Board, has reserved seats for agricultural workers, businesspeople and women.
 Isabela Provincial Board, aside from the IPMR, also has reserved seats for workers and women.
In some provinces, election slates consisting of candidates for governor, vice governor and board members may include multiple parties.

Camarines Norte vice gubernatorial election 
Incumbent Vice Governor Jonah Pimentel was in his third consecutive term when he was allowed to run. As the Local Government Code prohibits more than three consecutive terms of service, the Commission on Elections canceled his certificate of candidacy, and his proclamation as the winner in the vice gubernatorial election was also suspended. The top performing winner in the provincial board election, Joseph Panotes, was subsequently sworn in as acting vice governor until a final decision is made.

City and municipal elections 

Local parties are denoted by purple (unless otherwise indicated), independents by light gray, and ex officio members of the legislatures are in dark gray.
 Summary of results, parties ranked by mayor's partyships won.
Ex officio members are the representatives of the city or municipal chapters of the Liga ng mga Barangay and of the Sangguniang Kabataan (SK). These are determined from the nonpartisan 2018 barangay and SK elections. They first served on July 30, 2018, and will serve until January 1, 2022.
 Some councils have a reserved seat for indigenous people, called the "indigenous people mandatory representation (IPMR)".  These are not indicated in the national totals.
In some cities and municipalities, election slates consisting of candidates for mayor, vice mayor and councilors may include multiple parties.

Highly urbanized cities

Independent component cities

Component cities

Bangsamoro

Bicol Region

Cagayan Valley

Calabarzon

Caraga

Central Luzon

Central Visayas

Cordillera Administrative Region

Davao Region

Eastern Visayas

Ilocos Region

Mimaropa

Northern Mindanao

Soccsksargen

Western Visayas

Zamboanga Peninsula

Municipalities with at least 100,000 people
Based on the 2015 census.

Other cities and municipalities

References